Stenalia bilyi is a beetle in the genus Stenalia of the family Mordellidae. It was described in 1978.

References

bilyi
Beetles described in 1978